Terrence John Nugent (born December 5, 1961) is a former American football quarterback in the National Football League (NFL) who played for the Indianapolis Colts. He played college football for the Colorado State Rams. He was drafted by the Cleveland Browns in the 1984 NFL Draft.

References

1961 births
Living people
American football quarterbacks
Cleveland Browns players
Indianapolis Colts players
People from Merced, California
Players of American football from California
Colorado State Rams football players
National Football League replacement players